Roger McNair, known professionally as Rampage (formerly Rampage the Last Boy Scout), is an American rapper who is a member of the Flipmode Squad. He is a long-time collaborator with his cousin Busta Rhymes.

Early life and music career
Rampage was born Roger McNair in Brooklyn, New York City on August 1, 1974, to Katherine McNair and Roger Williams, who are from Jamaica.

In 1992, McNair was given his first recording deal with Dallas Austin on Rowdy / Arista Records and released the single "Beware of the Rampsack". In 1993 Rampage made his first guest appearance on the song  “Spontaneous (13 MC's Deep)” off Leaders Of The New School's T.I.M.E. (The Inner Mind's Eye). In 1994, he recorded “Flava in Ya Ear In (Remix)” with Craig Mack, Notorious B.I.G., LL Cool J and Busta Rhymes. In 1996, he recorded the platinum single "Woo Hah!! Got You All in Check" with Busta Rhymes for the platinum album The Coming.

One year later, he was given a second recording deal with Elektra Records and released his gold solo LP, Scout's Honor... by Way of Blood, which included the top-40 hit "Take It to the Streets" and "Wild for da Night". In 1998, he released The Imperial with the Flipmode Squad, which gave them their first Source Award in 1999. Since then, he has recorded with Busta Rhymes on numerous platinum albums and has appeared on various projects including a remix of the multi-platinum single “Fallin'” by Alicia Keys.

Currently based in Phoenix, Arizona, McNair recently signed an independent record label deal for his company DeepFreeze Entertainment (DFE) with Sure Shot Records. On that label, he has released for promotional use a single of a new group signed to DFE named Total Vision. Lady Day, a rapper, is also on the roster.

Around 2005, McNair decided to relaunch his solo career and released an official mixtape called Demagraffix which was designed as a starter for his second album, Have You Seen?, released in 2006 by Sure Shot Records.

In May 2020 Rampage released his hit single #Selfie produced by DJ Excel The MixMaster who has remixed for Sean Paul, Sasha, Fatman Scoop, Elephant Man, Cutty Ranks Panhead, and Beyonce.  A remix containing a sample from DMX "Party Up" was also released simultaneously to the original.

Discography

Studio albums
 Scout's Honor... By Way of Blood (1997)
 Have You Seen? (2006)
 Lieutenant on Deck (2013)

Collaborative albums
 The Imperial as part of the Flipmode Squad (1998)

References

External links

1974 births
African-American male rappers
Living people
Rappers from Brooklyn
American rappers of Jamaican descent
People from Flatbush, Brooklyn
21st-century American rappers
21st-century American male musicians
21st-century African-American musicians
20th-century African-American people